Gurmeet Ram Rahim Singh Insan (born 15 August 1967), known also as MSG, is the head of the Indian social group Dera Sacha Sauda (DSS) since 1990. Prior to a 2017 rape conviction, he was a religious leader, actor, singer, writer, songwriter, director, and composer. He was also convicted of being involved in the murder of journalist Ram Chander Chhatrapati. According to The Indian Express, a prisons department official said Bharatiya Janata Party-led Haryana government had started looking for a “suitable job” for Ram Rahim two years ago before the 2017 rape conviction.

The Indian Express had placed Ram Rahim 96th in their list of the 100 most powerful Indians of 2015. He has released several music albums and films, which typically revolve around himself and his teachings. He is usually credited in his films for various other roles, in one instance being credited in more than forty departments. His films were negatively received by critics, with many considering them propaganda and criticising their poor quality, although the production house claimed that several of them had grossed 1 billion.

On 25 August 2017, Ram Rahim was convicted of rape by a special Central Bureau of Investigation (CBI) court. His conviction led to widespread violence from members of the DSS and simultaneous clashes with the police, which left several dead and injured. On 28 August 2017, Ram Rahim was sentenced to 20 years in prison. In January 2019, he and three others were convicted of the murder of journalist Ram Chander Chhatrapati and sentenced to life imprisonment. He is also facing prosecution for other murders and ordering forced castrations.

The name MSG is thought to be derived either from the initials of the three DSS heads, Shah Mastana, Shah Satnam, and Gurmeet Ram Rahim Singh, or as an abbreviation for "Messenger of God".

Early life and family
Singh was born on 15 August 1967 at Sri Gurusar Modia village in Ganganagar district of Rajasthan. Born into a Jatt Sikh family, his father Maghar Singh was a landlord, and his mother Naseeb Kaur was a housewife. Maghar was a devoted follower of the DSS leader Shah Satnam Singh, and Gurmeet accompanied his father to the dera. At the age of 7, Singh was initiated into the Dera Sacha Sauda sect by Shah Satnam Singh.

As an adult, Singh did many jobs, including driving a tractor, and assisted his father in volunteer work at the dera and he retired and started a potato farm for 4 years. When Shah Satnam Singh announced his retirement in 1990, Singh was not one among the three contenders expected to succeed him. In a surprise public announcement, however, Satnam Shah appointed him as his successor, giving him the name "Huzoor Maharaj Gurmeet Ram Rahim". Ram Rahim became the leader of Dera at the age of 23, on 23 September 1990.

Ram Rahim and his wife Harjeet Kaur have two daughters, named Amarpreet and Charanpreet. They also have a son, Jasmeet, who is married to Husanmeet, a daughter of the Indian National Congress leader Harminder Singh Jassi. Ram Rahim also adopted his confidante Priyanka Taneja as his daughter, giving her the name Honeypreet in 2009. Ram Rahim's followers have adopted "Insan" ("human") as a surname.

Social work

The Dera runs 1 hospital and 10 educational institutes. Ram Rahim has organised drives for blood pressure, diabetes and cholesterol screening that have been recognised by Guinness World Records. He also hold the world record for most people sanitising their hands simultaneously also recognised by Guinness World Records. In association with the American Society of Echocardiography, he also organised the world record for "Most Cardiac Echo Tests" although it was proved as a 'scam' on 2 January 2022. On 21 September 2011 in New Delhi, Ram Rahim initiated a series of sanitation drives and also pledged his support to the Central Government's campaign. , about 30 Mega Cleanliness Campaigns have been conducted in several states of India. A CBI report investigating criminal allegations against him mentioned that Ram Rahim's "crusades against drugs, alcohol, and prostitution" have gained him a "larger-than-life" image. He has also spoken out against cattle slaughter in India.

Movement Against Prostitution 
In 2009 Ram Rahim had initiated a drive to eradicate forced prostitution from society and rescue them from high risk groups, the women who were pushed into flesh trade were to be brought back into the mainstream of the society and get married them in a good family. He also made arrangement for their treatment from HIV/AIDS and other sexually transmitted infections. Ram Rahim motivated his followers to marry sex workers and out of which 1500 men, agreed to marry women who had left the life of prostitution and wished to get assimilated in the mainstream of society. Many of these marriages have actually taken place.

Invitation From The United Nations 
Almost a month after Singh got convicted, on 4 October 2017, The United Nations Water Body, on their official Twitter handle, had invited Ram Rahim and his "adopted daughter", Honeypreet Insan, to support its World Toilet Day event which was held in November 2017. The rationale behind the United Nations' decision to invite two of India's most controversial figures is still puzzling, as the tweets were later taken down without any clarification.

Contribution to Sports 
In 2017, Ram Rahim had been nominated for Dronacharya Award by Yoga Federation of India (YFI) for producing ‘world champion yogis’, including World and Asian Cup winners. Ram Rahim has also established the MSG Bharatiya Khel Gaon, a sports village spread across 23 acres, in his Dera headquarters.

Political influence
Ram Rahim had been known for political clout, as his Dera has a large number of followers among Dalits, estimated to be over 70%. His Dera Sacha Sauda is the only one among the various Deras that openly asks its supporters to vote for particular political parties.

Ram Rahim originally supported the Indian National Congress. and aided them in the 2007 Punjab state elections esp. to wrest control of the Malwa region. Before the 2012 Punjab state elections, the Congress leader Amarinder Singh, his wife Preneet Kaur and his son Raninder Singh visited Ram Rahim, asking him to extend his support to Congress. However, Dera's support to Congress alienated the party's Sikh vote bank. In the 2012 elections, Congress performed poorly, and Jassi himself lost the election. The poor performance of Congress was seen as a signal of the downfall of Dera's political power.

Before the 2014 Haryana state elections, the Bharatiya Janata Party (BJP) leader And Prime Minister Shri Narendra Modi praised Ram Rahim in order to attract the Dera Sacha Sauda followers. Ram Rahim reciprocated by supporting the BJP in the state elections. and in February 2015, again in the Delhi assembly elections. He reportedly claimed to have over 2 million followers in Delhi. His organisation supported BJP in the Bihar assembly election in 2015, and nearly 3,000 Dera followers campaigned for BJP in the state. In 2016, the Haryana sports minister Anil Vij announced a  5 million grant to the Dera for promoting sports, in Ram Rahim's presence, which led to a controversy.

Controversies

Rape conviction

In 2002, a woman wrote to the respective Chief Ministers of the states of Punjab and Haryana, and to the Union Home Minister, CBI, NHRC and the Punjab and Haryana High Court, describing an incident involving Ram Rahim. The Punjab and Haryana High Court sought a report from the District and Sessions Judge of Sirsa, after which Judge MS Sular conducted an inquiry and submitted a report recommending a probe by a central agency.

After the report from Sirsa, the Punjab and Haryana High Court ordered the CBI to probe into the allegations levelled in the letter. The Chandigarh Branch, CBI registered a case of rape under the IPC Section 376, criminal intimidation under Section 506 and insult to the modesty of a woman under 509.
This letter was published in Ram Chander Chhatrapati's four-page Hindi eveninger, Poora Sach in 2002. A CBI probe was ordered into the incident on 24 September 2002. The investigations involved contacting 18 sadhvis who had left the dera by 2002. In the same year, Ram Rahim had charges levied against him for the murder of journalist Ram Chander Chhatrapati, who was writing articles at the time about Dera Sacha Sauda, and for the murder of Dera Sacha Sauda manager Ranjit Singh.

In 2014 Ram Rahim said he was impotent since 1990. The special CBI court rejected these contentions.

On 25 August 2017, a special CBI court in Panchkula, Haryana, delivered its verdict in a sexual assault case regarding a former Dera sadhvi, finding Ram Rahim guilty of two counts of rape. Ram Rahim was taken into custody. More than 200,000 people had gathered near the court premises ahead of the verdict in Panchkula, Haryana. Following the conviction, there were violent protests in parts of India with reports of widespread vandalism. 31–38 DSS members were killed in clashes with police and another 120–300 people were injured as a result. On 26 August 2017, the Punjab and Haryana High Court ordered the police to seize the properties of the group to compensate for the vandalism caused in protests by his supporters. On 28 August 2017, the CBI court sentenced him to a total of 20 years in prison, 10 years for each of the two rape convictions to be served consecutively. Ram Rahim challenged his rape conviction in the Punjab and Haryana High Courts on 9 October 2017.

Castration of followers
Ram Rahim has been prosecuted for being involved in enforcing the castration of hundreds of followers; Ram Rahim has denied the charges. On 5 October 2018 he was granted bail by a Panchkula CBI court in the case involving castration of 400 of his followers.

Conflict with Sikh and Hindu groups 
In May 2007, Ram Rahim was accused of hurting the religious sentiments of the Sikhs by wearing in an advertisement attire resembling the tenth and final living Sikh Guru Gobind Singh, by using a turban with a kalgi (egret feather). His followers also organised a demonstration against their alleged persecution at the hands of some religious organisations. Ram Rahim was attacked by a mob on 16 July 2007, but escaped unhurt. The Dera Sacha Sauda tendered multiple apologies, regretting confusion over the dress, and stated that it had high regard for all Sikh Gurus, Sikh religion and all of humanity. A multi religion delegation approached the apex Sikh organisation to accept the apology. While not rejecting the apology outright, the Akal Takht maintained it was inadequate on several counts.

A criminal case filed against him, for hurting the Sikh sentiments, was dismissed by the Sirsa court in 2009 and Bathinda court in 2014. Counter-terrorism expert Ajai Sahni has stated that the tensions between the Sikh community and the Dera have been exploited by the pro-Khalistan elements. He has further quoted Indian military intelligence that Iknoor Khalsa Fauj, Khalistan Zindabad Force and Khalistan Commando Force have attempted to eliminate him.
In a case where the Dera's followers were accused of being suicide attackers, the Dera has stated publicly that it was being targeted by vested political groups that were conspiring to defame it. The organisation has demanded a judicial probe into the allegations.

On 2 February 2008, Ram Rahim's cavalcade was attacked, with explosives injuring 11 persons. A Khalistan Liberation Force member was later arrested and confessed to arranging explosives and executing the plan along with his associates. After that, Ram Rahim was protected with Z+ security cover. On 20 June 2008, a group of Sikhs shouted anti-Dera slogans during Ram Rahim's visit to the Nirmal Lifestyles mall in Mumbai. The situation developed into an altercation between the protestors and the Dera followers, and one of the Sikh protestors was killed. This led to further protests from Sikhs in Mumbai and Punjab. On 27 September 2015, the Akal Takht accepted his apology and pardoned him, but, on observing widespread resentment and protest among Sikhs regarding his pardon, the organisation revoked the pardon on 16 October.

On 8 November 2021 the Punjab Police found concrete evidence for Gurmeet Ram Rahim's involvement in more than 107 cases of Guru Granth Sahib sacrilege cases. He was brought to investigation although no FIR has been issued yet. The Dera Sacha Sauda chief was named as an accused in the theft of 52 "bir's" (copy) of the Guru Granth Sahib, the holy book of Sikhs and burning of a Gurudwara and 49 Swaroops along with tearing and misusing 6 of them. The court had, however, said Gurmeet Ram Rahim Singh would not be taken to the Faridkot court in pursuance of a production warrant, according to Hindustan Times the Dera Chief didn't cooperate fully.

The previous SAD-BJP government in Punjab had handed over three cases—lodged in connection with the theft of a copy of the Guru Granth Sahib from a Burj Jawahar Singh Wala gurdwara, putting up of handwritten sacrilegious posters in Bargari and Burj Jawahar Singh Wala, and torn pages of the holy book found at Bargari—to the Central Bureau of Investigation (CBI).

Currently death threats have been issued against him with placards saying "Satkar Committee, Shiromani Gurudwara  Parbandhak Committee and Shiromani Budha Dal Fauj please give justice, this Devil (Dusht) has killed the Guru Maharaj, defeat him through the sword (Kirpan) or through the pen (Kalam)."

In January 2016, the Vishwa Hindu Parishad lodged a complaint with police after Ram Rahim dressed up as the Hindu god Vishnu.

In September 2017, the Hindu society Akhil Bharatiya Akhara Parishad, had denounced Ram Rahim Singh as a fake baba.

Murder conviction
In January 2019, Ram Rahim was convicted of the murder of journalist Ram Chander Chhatrapati.  Chhatrapati was shot in 2002 outside his home after reporting articles on the rape charges facing Ram Rahim. Afterwards, Chhatrapati's father gave a letter to police implicating Dera members. On 17 January 2019, Ram Rahim was sentenced to life imprisonment by Special CBI Court along with three other men involved. Ram Rahim challenged his murder conviction in the Punjab and Haryana High Courts on 15 March 2019.

Parole 
On 24 October 2020, the jail superintendent granted Ram Rahim one day of parole, to allow him to visit his ailing mother in a hospital in Gurgaon. The administration secretly carried out the work and Ram Rahim was accompanied by police.

On 21 May 2021, Ram Rahim's parole application to visit his unwell mother was approved, which lead to his release for 12 hours, "from sunrise to sunset", under police protection.

In February 2022, Ram Rahim was granted 21-day furlough to meet his family. He was given Z plus security.

In June 2022, Ram Rahim was granted a 30-day parole, during which he stayed at his Dera Sacha Sauda Ashram, Barnawa, in Uttar Pradesh's Baghpat. The parole was objected by the SGPC.

On 14 October 2022, Ram Rahim was granted a 40-day parole, during which he again stayed at Barnawa, in Uttar Pradesh's Baghpat. During his parole, he released three music videos of tracks wrote, sang, produced and composed by him, titled "Sadi Nit Diwali", "Jaago Duniya De Loko" and "Chat Pe Chat", on his own YouTube channel. Delhi Commission for Women's chairperson Swati Maliwal appealed to cancel the parole.

On 21 January 2023, Ram Rahim has been given parole for 40 days.  Ram Rahim applied for parole which has been accepted

Discography

Albums

Film soundtracks

Non-Album Singles

Filmography

Films

Online Gurukul was scheduled to be a future project involving Ram Rahim speaking out against terrorism, along with playing in six different roles.
On 2 September 2017, the Indian Film & Television Directors’ Association (IFTDA) and the Cine and TV Artists Association (CINTAA) banned Ram Rahim from future work in Indian film and television for  "criminality and moral turpitude".

References

External links
 
 

21st-century criminals
Dera Sacha Sauda
Indian people convicted of rape
Members of the clergy convicted of rape
People from Sri Ganganagar district
Living people
1967 births
Male actors from Rajasthan
20th-century Indian male actors
Male actors in Hindi cinema
Film directors from Rajasthan
Hindi-language film directors
Film producers from Rajasthan
Indian film score composers
Activists from Rajasthan
Prisoners and detainees of India
Indian people convicted of murder